Henri Charles Manguin (23 March 187425 September 1949) was a French painter, associated with the Fauves.

Manguin entered the École des Beaux-Arts to study under Gustave Moreau, as did Henri Matisse and Charles Camoin with whom he became close friends. Like them, Manguin made copies of Renaissance art in the Louvre.

Manguin was greatly influenced by Impressionism, as is seen in his use of bright pastel hues.

He married in 1899 and made numerous portraits of his wife, Jeanne, and their family. In 1902, Manguin had his first exhibition at the Salon des Indépendants and Salon d'Automne. Many of his paintings were of Mediterranean landscapes; and would soon represent the height of his career as a Fauve artist.

1905 Indépendants

From 24 March to 30 April, the burgeoning of Fauvism was visible at the Indépendants, prior to the infamous Salon d'Automne exhibition of 1905 which historically marks the birth of the term Fauvism, after critic Louis Vauxcelles described their show of work with the phrase "Donatello chez les fauves" ("Donatello among the wild beasts"), contrasting the paintings with a Renaissance-style sculpture that shared the room with them.

At the 1905 Indépendants Manguin exhibited with Henri Matisse, Albert Marquet, Jean Puy, Othon Friesz, Raoul Dufy, Kees van Dongen, André Derain, Maurice de Vlaminck, Charles Camoin and Jean Metzinger. This exhibition was reviewed by Vauxcelles in Gil Blas on 4, 18 and 23 March 1905.

Matisse was in charge of the hanging committee, assisted by Manguin, Metzinger, Bonnard, Camoin, Laprade Luce, Marquet, Puy and Vallotton.

From 1920
In 1920, Manguin exhibited at the Gallery Marcel Bernheim together with Ottmann, Tirman, Alexandre-Paul Canu and others.
He traveled extensively with Albert Marquet throughout Southern Europe. In 1949, Manguin left Paris to settle in Saint-Tropez, where he died soon after, on 25 September 1949.

Gallery of paintings

References

External links

Henri Manguin, Thyssen-Bornemisza Museum, Madrid
Henri Manguin, biography, Gallery Fleury
Henri Manguin, Web Gallery of Impressionists
Henri Manguin, Artcyclopedia

1874 births
1949 deaths
Painters from Paris
19th-century French painters
French male painters
20th-century French painters
20th-century French male artists
Fauvism
19th-century French male artists